Jeff Harwell (born September 7, 1986) is an American soccer player who currently plays for Austin Aztex in the USL Premier Development League.

Career

Youth and Amateur
Harwell attended Jesuit College Preparatory School, and played college soccer at Southern Methodist University, where he was selected to the Conference USA All-Freshman team in 2005, and the All-Conference USA third-team as a junior.

Professional
Despite being invited to the 2008 MLS Combine, Harwell was not drafted, and having been unable to secure a professional contract elsewhere, signed with Austin Aztex U23 of the USL Premier Development League for the 2009 season. After making one appearance for the U23 team, Harwell was promoted up to the Austin Aztex senior team in May 2009, and made his debut for the team on May 29, 2009, in a game against Puerto Rico Islanders.

References

External links
 Austin Aztex bio

1986 births
Living people
American soccer players
SMU Mustangs men's soccer players
Austin Aztex U23 players
Austin Aztex FC players
Austin Aztex players
Soccer players from Texas
USL League Two players
USL First Division players
Association football midfielders
Jesuit College Preparatory School of Dallas alumni